Nan McKenzie Laird (born September 18, 1943) is the Harvey V. Fineberg Professor of Public Health, Emerita in Biostatistics at the Harvard T.H. Chan School of Public Health. She served as Chair of the Department from 1990 to 1999.  She was the Henry Pickering Walcott Professor of Biostatistics from 1991 to 1999. Laird is a Fellow of the American Statistical Association, as well as the Institute of Mathematical Statistics.  She is a member of the International Statistical Institute.

Education
Laird began her undergraduate studies at Rice University in 1961, first majoring in mathematics, before switching to French. She left Rice in her junior year in college and moved to New York City. Later, she resumed studies at University of Georgia in computer science before eventually switching to statistics and earned her BA in 1969. Laird worked between 1969 and 1971 as a computer programmer on the Apollo program at MIT's Draper Laboratory before starting her graduate studies at Harvard University in statistics in 1971. She received her PhD from Harvard in 1975 under Arthur Dempster and was hired as a faculty member directly after graduation. She remained at Harvard until her retirement, when she became an emeritus professor.

Career and research
Laird is well known for many seminal papers in biostatistics applications and methods, including the Expectation-maximization algorithm.

Selected publications

 
 Laird NM and Ware, JH. (1982) "Random effects models for longitudinal data: an overview of recent results". Biometrics,; 38:963-974.

Honors and awards
Her honors include the third International Prize in Statistics in 2021, the 25th Annual Distinguished Statistician Lecture from the University of Connecticut, the American Statistical Association and Pfizer in 2016, the 25th Annual Lowell Reed Lecturer, from the American Public Health Association in 2011, the Samuel S. Wilks Award, from the American Statistical Association in 2011, the Myra Samuels Lecturer award from Purdue University in 2004, the Janet L. Norwood Award in 2003 from the American Statistical Association, the Florence Nightingale David Award in 2001 from the Committee of Presidents of Statistical Societies, and several other fellowships.

References

1943 births
Living people
American statisticians
20th-century American mathematicians
Women statisticians
Fellows of the Institute of Mathematical Statistics
Rice University alumni
University of Georgia alumni
Harvard University alumni
Harvard University faculty
Fellows of the American Statistical Association
Elected Members of the International Statistical Institute
20th-century women mathematicians
Fellows of the American Association for the Advancement of Science
People from Gainesville, Florida
Massachusetts Institute of Technology people